In popular usage, the term British Invasion refers to a cultural phenomenon of the mid-1960s in which rock and pop music artists from the United Kingdom and other aspects of British culture became popular in the United States.

British Invasion may also refer to:

Entertainment
Second British Invasion, a similar influx into the United States in the 1980s, based on MTV airplay of British music
British soul invasion (or Third British Invasion), a musical movement of the 2000s and 2010s, centered on British R&B and soul artists
British Invasion (comics), an influx of British comics writers onto American comic books
The British Invasion (professional wrestling), a professional wrestling tag team who performed in Total Nonstop Action Wrestling
"The British Invasion" (Dexter), an episode of the drama series Dexter
British Invasion (car show), an annual British automobile show in Stowe, Vermont
America's Next Top Model: British Invasion, an alternative name of America's Next Top Model (cycle 18)
British Invasion, a live DVD by American glam metal band Steel Panther

Sport
1961 Indianapolis 500, known as the British Invasion

Military history
Invasions of the British Isles, an overview of historical invasions of the British Isles from c. 4000 BC to 1797
British invasions of the River Plate, military attacks by British forces on Buenos Aires and the Río de la Plata area
War of 1812, includes both a British invasion of the United States and a United States invasion of British Canada
British invasion of Iceland during World War II

See also
List of wars involving the United Kingdom